Téboursouk is a town and commune in the Béja Governorate, Tunisia. It is located at 36° 27′ 26″N, 009° 14′ 54″E.

Population

In 2004 it had a total population of 10,987, and of 22,115 inhabitants in 2014.

Geography
The town is part of the governorate of Béja, and it constitutes a municipality.
It overlooks olive groves in the valley of Wadi Khalled.

Téboursouk is located on the territory of the Berber tribe of the Bejaoua, near the Drid tribe, at the northern end of the Haut-Tell.

History

During the Roman Empire, Teboursouc was known as "Tubursico-Bure", and was in the Roman province of Africa Proconsularis. The ruins of ancient Thubursicum Bure are a large Byzantine enclosure of pentagonal form, erected under the reign of Justin II (565-578), and whose northern front encompasses a Roman gate and cemetery.

The Roman city was considered a municipium.

The city obtained the statute of municipality in 1904 under the French protectorate and the status of chief town of delegation at the independence of Tunisia. In 2004, the municipality celebrated the centenary of its creation.

Bishopric
During Roman and Byzantine times the city was the seat of a Catholic diocese, the suffragan of Archdiocese of Carthage.

There are four documented bishops of Teboursouk. Servus Dei is mentioned by Augustine of Hippo in his Contra Cresconio around 404 and he had as a competitor the Donatist Bishop, Cyprian, who, according to the testimony of Augustine, was deposed by Primianus (the Donatist Bishop of Carthage) because "Cyprian, was caught in a brothel.

At the conference of Carthage of 411, between Catholic bishops and Donatists the same Servus Dei, and was joined by the Donatist bishop Donato, who had replaced the now disgraced Cyprian.

Bishop Reparato attended the Council of Carthage (525).

Today Tubursico-Bure survives as titular bishopric and the current titular bishop is Mykhaylo Bubniy, Exarch Archbishop of Odessa.

See also
List of cities in Tunisia

References

Communes of Tunisia
Populated places in Béja Governorate
Roman towns and cities in Tunisia
Ancient Berber cities
Catholic titular sees in Africa